Dravon Askew-Henry (born October 24, 1995) is an American football safety for the New Jersey Generals of the United States Football League (USFL). He played college football for the West Virginia Mountaineers.

Early years
Askew-Henry attended Aliquippa High School. He compiled 5,454 rushing yards in his career and was a two-time Pennsylvania Class 2A first-team all-state selection. He was one of the top recruits in Pennsylvania and signed with West Virginia.

College career
Askew-Henry started a school-record 51 games in four seasons at West Virginia. As a true freshman in 2014, he started 13 games and compiled 45 tackles (36 solo) and two interception. Askew-Henry posted 59 tackles and one interception as a sophomore. Coming into the 2016 season, he was one of three returning starters on defense but was forced to redshirt the 2016 season after sustaining an ACL tear in the preseason. Askew-Henry was the team's fourth-leading tackler as a junior with 57 tackles (42 solo), 2.5 tackles for loss, and one interception, earning him Honorable Mention All-Big 12 honors. As a senior, he made 54 tackles (37 solo), including five tackles for loss, and intercepted two passes. Askew-Henry was named Honorable Mention All-Big 12 for the second consecutive season. In his career, he tallied 215 tackles (162 solo), 9.5 tackles for loss, six interceptions and 10 pass breakups.

Professional career

Pittsburgh Steelers 
Despite being given a fifth-to-seventh round grade, Askew-Henry went undrafted in the 2019 NFL draft. Askew-Henry signed with the Pittsburgh Steelers on April 27, 2019. He was waived on August 31 during final roster cuts.

Jacksonville Jaguars 
After his stint with the Steelers, Askew-Henry, subsequently joined the Jacksonville Jaguars but did not play in 2019.

New England Patriots 
Askew-Henry signed with the New England Patriots in 2019, but did not play for them.

New York Guardians 
Askew-Henry signed with the New York Guardians of the XFL after being selected with the 31st overall selection in Phase Four of the 2020 XFL Draft. He made a season-high five tackles (three solo) in his XFL debut against the Tampa Bay Vipers. Against the Los Angeles Wildcats, he was involved in a play in which he was called for a holding penalty and caught the penalty flag after the official tossed it. Askew-Henry tossed the flag back, but was hit with the holding call as well as a 15-yard unsportsmanlike conduct. The season was terminated early due to the coronavirus pandemic. In four games, Askew-Henry had 12 tackles (10 solo) and six pass breakups. He had his contract terminated when the league suspended operations on April 10, 2020.

New York Giants 
On April 16, 2020, Askew-Henry signed with the New York Giants. The deal was reportedly a two-year contract for $1.39 million with no signing bonus and base salary of $610,000. He was waived on September 5, 2020.

New Jersey Generals 
Askew-Henry was selected in the 19th round of the 2022 USFL Draft by the New Jersey Generals.

Personal life
Askew-Henry's cousin by marriage is Pro Bowl cornerback Darrelle Revis. He has trained with Revis and considers him a mentor.

References

External links
 New York Giants bio
 West Virginia Mountaineers bio

1995 births
Living people
American football safeties
Players of American football from Pennsylvania
Sportspeople from the Pittsburgh metropolitan area
People from Aliquippa, Pennsylvania
West Virginia Mountaineers football players
New York Guardians players
New York Giants players
New Jersey Generals (2022) players